Lukiškės (also spelled Łukiszki, Lukiski, Lukishki) can refer to several things:

 , a historic neighborhood of Vilnius known for its Tatar community
 Lukiškės Square, a large square in Vilnius known formerly as Lenin Square
 Lukiškės Prison, a prison in Vilnius established in 1904